Avonbank is a community on the Avon River in the township of Perth South, Perth County in Southwestern Ontario Ontario, Canada.

Michael Steele, a physician and member of the House of Commons of Canada, was born in Avonbank.

References

Communities in Perth County, Ontario